Forever Famicom is a studio album by American rapper Random and K-Murdock, released on June 1, 2010 by Neosonic Records. It samples from a variety of NES and Super NES games. The album has been released in the US and Japan.

Production history
After releasing his second chiptune album, Mega Ran 9 in 2009, Random released two more albums before the announcement of Forever Famicom on the official Mega Ran website. The album, from its conception in late 2007 to its completion phase, took almost three years of back-and-forth recording with K-Murdock over the Internet. In addition to the announcement, two tracks, "Dream Master" and "Epoch" were leaked in a double-single. On May 23, 2010, preorders were available to be put in before the release date the next week. The album released on June 1, 2010, along with an additional album, Forever Famicom DLC that featured bonus tracks and instrumentals.

On July 7, 2010, Random announced the "Forever Famicom Tour," which was to hit the southeast, starting with Charlotte, North Carolina.

Track listing

Forever Famicom DLC

On July 6, 2010, Random and K-Murdock released Forever Famicom DLC, an album featuring "downloadable content" for their album released five days earlier. The album includes instrumentals from all fourteen tracks of Forever Famicom, as well as bonus tracks, outtakes, and new pieces.

Forever Famicom DLC 2

On September 6, 2011, a second and final installment of "DLC" was released, titled Forever Famicom DLC 2. Instead of outtakes from the original album, DLC 2 features completely new tracks.

References

Hip hop albums by American artists
2010 albums